Membranomyces is a genus of fungi in the family Clavulinaceae. The genus, circumscribed in 1975, contains two species found in Europe and Canada.

References

External links

Clavulinaceae
Agaricomycetes genera
Taxa named by Walter Jülich
Fungi described in 1975